Stephanie Wiand is a producer and actress, known for Fixing Paco: Changing Lives (2012), Revenge of the Bimbot Zombie Killers (2014), and Deliver the Mother (2018). She joined the World Wrestling Federation in late 1994 as co-host of WWF Mania where she was introduced as original host Todd Pettengill's Christmas present. She was brought in to replace Randy Savage, who had left the company. Wiand was a host for the 1994 Slammy Awards. She also hosted the first In Your House event in mid 1995 and featured in the 32X version of WWF Raw video game. She left the WWF in July 1995 due to a contract dispute.

References

External sources

American actresses
Living people
Year of birth missing (living people)
21st-century American women